J. Grant Woods (May 19, 1954 – October 23, 2021) was an American attorney and politician who served as Attorney General of Arizona from 1991 until 1999. Woods was a moderate-to-liberal Republican who served as John McCain's chief of staff when he was a congressman. He endorsed Hillary Clinton in the 2016 United States presidential election and Joe Biden in the 2020 United States presidential election.

Background and early career
Grant Woods was the son of Joe Woods, a developer in the Mesa, Arizona area.

Woods attended the Arizona State University College of Law (now the Sandra Day O'Connor College of Law), graduating in 1979. h

Career

Woods, considered a moderate-to-liberal Republican, was the Arizona Attorney General from 1991 to 1999. In the 1980s, he was the first congressional chief of staff for the late U.S. Sen. John McCain, R-Ariz., and was a longtime friend and confidant of McCain's.

During the 2016 United States presidential election, he endorsed the Democratic candidate, Hillary Clinton. Regarding the two presidential candidates, he wrote, "Hillary Clinton is one of the most qualified nominees to ever run for president. Donald Trump is the least qualified ever. The stakes are too high to stand on the sideline. I stand with Hillary Clinton for president."

Woods delivered a eulogy at Senator McCain's funeral in 2018. Woods recounted stories of his time with McCain and wrote that their friendship was "a little bit harrowing, a little bit wild ... but a lot of fun. And the greatest honor of my life".

Jon Kyl was appointed to succeed McCain, but said he would not run for re-election. He resigned in December 2018 and Governor Doug Ducey appointed Martha McSally to fill the  remainder of the term. A special election would be held in 2020. Woods considered running for the seat as a Democrat; however, he announced on February 8, 2019, that he would not seek election to McCain's former senate seat in 2020 to avoid campaigning against other Democrats, stating that "Democrats are not the problem." He supported Joe Biden in the 2020 Democratic Party presidential primaries and the 2020 United States presidential election, writing "The future of our country is at stake... If you think the last two and a half years have been bad, try eight years of Donald Trump. My message to Democrats is, 'Look we can have a nice primary, that's fine, but why don't we nominate somebody who can actually win?' That's Joe Biden."

In June 2021, Woods was fired from the law firm Gallagher & Kennedy (G&K), after he sent out a tweet criticizing Arizona Diamondbacks owner Ken Kendrick. G&K is the legal representative for the Diamondbacks.

Personal life
Woods was married to the former Marlene Galan, and had five children. He died from a heart attack on October 23, 2021, at age 67.
Woods first wife, Barbara Ross, is the mother of his 2 oldest children.

Electoral history

References

External links
 
 Official Website of Grant Woods (Unsecured)

1954 births
2021 deaths
20th-century American lawyers
20th-century American politicians
21st-century American lawyers
Arizona Attorneys General
Arizona Democrats
Arizona Republicans
Arizona State University alumni
Occidental College alumni
People from Elk City, Oklahoma